Ayurveda was an independent rock-based band with a progressive style that is ambient, heavy, and alternative with electronic and Nepalese influences.  They are based out of Ithaca, NY when not on tour. The five member band is:  Tom Burchinal (vocals and keys), Diwas Gurung (guitar and vocals), Shikhar R. Bajracharya (guitar), Dan Halperin (bass and laptop), and Mike Parker (drums). 

Ayurveda performed their final show at the 2011 Grassroots festival in Ithaca prior to Tom parting ways with the band. Dan, Mike, and Diwas have since formed a new group called Photoreal.

Background 

Ayurveda (pronounced \ī-er-'vā-de\) is a Sanskrit word meaning the knowledge of life. The band chose its name based on their connection to Ayurvedic and humanistic principles; its members strive to express this connection through their music and their personal spiritual practices. Burchinal, Bajracharyia, and Gurung met one another at Ithaca College and in the Ithaca, NY community during the 2002/2003 school year and after several different bassists and drummers, settled on the current quintet lineup in early 2006. They record under their own independent label.

Between 2005 and 2010, Ayurveda recorded and released 6 discs—3 LPs and 3 EPs. From 2008 to 2011 they produced and released six live (HD) videos and one concept video from Diwas Gurung's album Rato Mato, "Domestic Bliss". All videos were shot in collaboration with Joe Zohar and Moving Box Studios. Ayurveda is a U.S. touring band with thousands of followers in the United States and internationally. Ayurveda has a large following among the Nepali community both in the U.S. and Nepal. Their Nepalese connection comes through band members Diwas Gurung, who was born and raised in Nepal and Shikhar Bajaracharya, the son of first generation U.S. immigrants from Nepal.

Influences 

In a 2010 interview in St. Cloud, MN, Tom Burchinal and Mike Parker described their music sound as "something like Tool meets Radiohead...with a little Led Zeppelin...and a Beatles/Pink Floyd base.". In the same interview and with regard to their progressive style, Parker added, "[Ayurveda is] progressive in the sense [that] our first record sounded like one thing and the second record sounded like something else; and then we did another record and that sounded completely different...there's a natural progression to life and we welcome that in our music."

Activism 

Ayurveda participates in a number of causes and activities in support of community organizations such as the Ithaca Health Alliance which focuses on providing affordable health care to un- and under-insured Tompkins County residents. They routinely collaborate with and support local designers, artists, and photographers in the design of their CD sleeves, inserts, and shows.

The band is strongly committed to the protection of the environment. Ayurveda recently joined thousands of New Yorkers in the fight to keep drinking water and soil safe by keeping oil and gas companies from using New York state land for the purpose of hydraulic fracturing. At the international level, the band co-hosts fundraisers for an orphanage in Kathmandu, Nepal --Ghar Sita Mutu – House with a Heart.

Recordings 

All Ayurveda recordings after Being have been produced by the band and engineered by drummer, Mike Parker. The initial mixing phase falls on Parker's shoulders while the final mix is a collaborative effort involving all members. A window into Ayurveda's give and take mixing process can be seen through their video "God Ain't" from Down the Staircase.

H. luminous (2010) H. luminous was released in May, 2010. It is a 25-minute, eight-movement, concept piece recorded live in the studio at Pyramid Sound Studios in Ithaca, NY. H. luminous takes the listener on a shamanic journey of humankind's transformation and evolution from Homo sapiens to Homo luminous. The piece was conceptualized by lyricist, Tom Burchinal, and offers an anti-apocalyptic viewpoint of the popularized end-date of the Mayan Long Count Calendar in 2012.

CD sleeves for H. luminous were silk-screened and printed by the band using 100% post-consumer recycled cardboard. The 16-panel album insert features artwork from five Ithaca-based artists and follows the symbolic transformation from homo sapiens to enlightened beings as portrayed in H. luminous. Under Burchinal's direction, Nicoli Schwiep designed both the album cover and insert layout.

Down the Staircase  (2009) Down the Staircase was released in September, 2009. All songs on Ayurveda's sophomore full-length album are original and were written collectively by the band with lyrics by Tom Burchinal. Down the Staircase represents Ayurveda's first real album as a collective in that several compositions on their previous release, Being, were written before Mike Parker and Dan Halperin officially joined the band.

Down the Staircase was recorded simultaneously with their EP, Veda, during the Veda Sessions. It includes "Polyphagia", "Xenocide", and "God Ain't". The majority of the songs on Down the Staircase were written while four of the five band members (minus Parker) shared a house in Ithaca. An early rehearsal video of "Happy Little Pills" was shot at the house in one take by videographer, Joe Zohar. For the most part, the album was recorded and produced in Mike Parker's basement with Parker at the engineering controls. The remainder of the recording process and the album's subsequent mixing were done at Pyramid Sound Studios under Parker's direction with support from Alex Perialas. Perialas is known for his work with Overkill, Anthrax, Testament, and Bad Religion. Just as with H. luminous, the CD sleeves were silk-screened and printed by the band on 100% post-consumer recycled cardboard. The album insert was designed by Nicoli Schwiep.

Veda (2009) - Veda was released in July 2009—several months before the official release of Down the Staircase. It is primarily a covers record but includes slightly different mixes of two tracks from Down the Staircase, "Polyphagia" and "Down the Staircase". An in-session video of one of the EP's covers, "Army of Me", accompanied the release of the EP and provides perspective into the band's process of tracking vocals. The video was shot by Joe Zohar.

Rato Mato (2009) - Rato Mato was released in May, 2009 under the band's lead guitarist, Diwas Gurung's name. It is primarily a collection of traditional Nepali folk songs transformed into what the band refers to as NeoNepalese folk rock. Although it is not considered an official Ayurveda album, Mike Parker and Dan Halperin were major collaborators. It includes one original from Diwas--"Domestic Bliss"—which was written early in his career and was influenced by Paul McCartney; Burchinal provided the vocals on this track. It also includes a track written by Diwas' father and Nepali folk singer, Om Gurung, entitled "Mai Runchu" (Om Gurung performs under the stage name, O.B. Soaltee.) For the most part, the album was recorded and mixed in Mike Parker's basement.

The band has incorporated several of Rato Mato's tracks into their live shows, particularly "Sanjha Ko Belama" which was captured live in 2009 by Joe Zohar at the Grassroots Festival of Music and Dance in Trumansburg, NY.

Being  (2008) Being, an original 13-track LP, was released in April, 2008 and is the band's first official release. It features the first compositions written by present-day members of Ayurveda and includes "Universal Mind", "Porkchop", and "Live to Grow". It also features several tracks from the pre-Parker/Halperin days, including "White" and "(Kept In) Limbo". The album was produced and mixed by Alex Perialas, engineered by Mike Parker, and all tracks but "Disciple" were recorded at Pyramid Sound Studios; "Disciple" was recorded in Mike Parker's basement. The band released a supporting video from the album, "Universal Mind".

Ayurveda (White-cover) EP (2006)  This self-titled work is Ayurveda's initial foray into the studio and second EP. It was recorded in the Fall of 2005 at Pyramid Sound Studios in Ithaca, NY and was produced and mixed by Alex Perialas and engineered by Mike Parker. It is an all original EP. At the time of recording, Parker and Halperin were not yet full members of the band. Parker, who was a studio engineer and musician at Pyramid Studios, collaborated with early Ayurveda and played on the record but it wasn't until the EP's release show on February 24 that Parker and Halperin officially joined the band. The EP contains 5 songs, "Shopwench", "White", "Harmful Armful", "Red Flag", and an untitled track.

Ayurveda (Green-logo) Demo EP (2005)  This untitled demo recording was sold at local area shows on CDRs during the summer of 2005 and is a mix of live and studio material. The disc had a different stylized green logo and contained the songs "Treason in the First Degree" (live & studio editions), "Manpower", "Shopwench" (live), and "(Kept in) Limbo". Both live tracks were taken from a recording of the June 24th (2005) show at The Haunt in Ithaca, NY.

Veda Sessions 

The term was adopted by the band to describe a six-month period in 2009 when Ayurveda recorded both Down The Staircase and the Veda EP. It was a transformational period when they adopted a new sound—a change from the direct, hard-edged and heavy rock heard on Being, to a more subtle fusion of influences.

Discography 
H.luminous (2010)
Down the Staircase (2009)
Veda Sessions (2009)
Rato Mato (Diwas Gurung w/Ayurveda) (2009)
Being (2008)
(White-label) EP (2006)
(Green-logo) Demo EP (2005)

Videography 
 Domestic Bliss (2011) Moving Box Studios 
 Planck Time > Xenocide - Live at Shakori Hills Grassroots Festival (Spring 2011) Moving Box Studios 
 Kashmir - live (Led Zeppelin Cover) (2010) Moving Box Studios  
 Live @ Grassroots Festival of Music and Dance (2009)  Moving Box Studios 
 God Ain't (2009) Moving Box Studios
 Army of Me (2009) Moving Box Studios
 Happy Little Pills (2009) Moving Box Studios
 Universal Mind (2008)  Moving Box Studios

Reviews 
 Atreya, Gagan "Ayurveda Interview." ktmROCKS. Online. retrieved 25 Mar 2011.
 Jenkins, Mark  "CD Review: Ayurveda's H. 'Luminous'." Washington Post 10 Dec 2010. Online. retrieved 17 Dec 2010.
 Abnormally  "Ayurveda." sputnik music 18 Aug 2010. Online. retrieved 17 Dec 2010. 
 " Ayurvedic doctor. " " what is ayurveda . " ayurvedic remedies . " " history of ayurveda ."  ayurvedic medicine benefits . "  12 May 2019.  Print. https://www.meraindia.info/2019/09/blog-post_22.html "HOPLESS01: Ayurveda's information check."Online. retrieved 17 Sep 2019.]
 Rana, Pranaya SJB.  "Rato Mato: Young musician offers a fresh take on Nepali folk." V.E.N.T.! Magazine 29 Jun 2009.  Online.  retrieved 17 Dec 2010 
 Shen, Maxine.  "MPFREES."  New York Post 9 Dec 2008.  Online. retrieved 11 Jun 2011.

References

External links 
 
 
 Live Music Archive section 
 Bệnh xuất tinh sớm

Alternative rock groups from New York (state)
American experimental rock groups
Nepalese rock music groups
Progressive rock musical groups from New York (state)
https://shivyogayurveda.in/dr-bm-hegde-speaks-on-the-idea-of-how-the-ayurvedic-medicines-are-far-better-for-the-human-body-than-western-medicines/